Dookie is the third studio album and the major label debut by American punk rock band Green Day.

Dookie may also refer to:
 Dookie (dog), a Pembroke Welsh Corgi bought in 1933 by King George VI
 Dookie (poker variation)
 Dookie, Victoria, Australia
 Dookie United Football Club, an Australian rules football club based in Dookie, Victoria, Australia
 Dookie V or Richard John Vitale (born 1939), American basketball sportscaster
 Dookie, the library of agricultural and veterinary sciences at University of Melbourne
 Dookie, a U.S. slang term for defecation or feces